Moon Flower is the first album by the Underneath released on March 18, 2008 in the U.S. and on July 23, 2008 in Japan. The Japanese edition had a different track-order, an extra song titled "Getting Closer" and all of the tracks were re-mixed and remastered.

Track listing

U.S. Edition

Japan Edition

References

2008 albums